Lorenzo Scarafoni (born 4 December 1965) is an Italian footballer. Following his retirement in 1999, he has worked as a coach.

Playing career

Club
Scarafoni, who could play as either a forward or a winger, began his playing career in the 1981-82 season with his hometown club, Ascoli. He spent seven seasons with Ascoli, after which he had spells in both Serie A and Serie B with Bari, Pisa, Cesena and Palermo. His most prolific season was in 1993-94, when his 15 goals helped Cesena to the brink of promotion to Serie A–Cesena missed out on promotion after losing a play-off with Padova.

International
Scarafoni made 11 appearances for the Italy under-21s from 1987 to 1988. He made his debut on 28 January 1987 in a 1–0 win against East Germany. He took part in the 1988 UEFA European Under-21 Football Championship and was involved in both legs of Italy's quarter-final defeat to France.

Coaching career
Following his retirement in 1999, Scarafoni worked as the youth-team coach of Fermana. He later worked as Carlo Mazzone's assistant at both Bologna and Livorno.

References

1965 births
Living people
People from Ascoli Piceno
Italian footballers
Italy under-21 international footballers
Ascoli Calcio 1898 F.C. players
S.S.C. Bari players
U.S. Triestina Calcio 1918 players
Pisa S.C. players
A.C. Cesena players
Palermo F.C. players
A.C. Ancona players
Ravenna F.C. players
Serie A players
Serie B players
Association football forwards
Italian football managers
Bologna F.C. 1909 non-playing staff
S.S. Fidelis Andria 1928 managers
U.S. Fermana managers
Sportspeople from the Province of Ascoli Piceno
Footballers from Marche